Beneath the Lion Rock is an alternative English translation for:
 Below the Lion Rock, a TV show about the lives of Hong Kong citizens
 Below the Lion Rock (song), the theme song of the show, sung by Roman Tam